María Luisa Ocampo Heredia (24 November 1899 – 15 August 1974) was a Mexican novelist, playwright, and translator. Born in Chilpancingo, 
Guerrero, her parents were Melchor R. Ocampo and Isaura Heredia; there was at least one sibling, the actress, Gloria Iturbe. She studied at the Escuela Superior de Comercio y Administración, the Escuela Nacional Preparatoria, and at the National Autonomous University of Mexico She founded the theatrical group, Los Pirandellos.

References

1899 births
1974 deaths
Mexican women novelists
Mexican dramatists and playwrights
Women dramatists and playwrights
Mexican translators
National Autonomous University of Mexico alumni
20th-century Mexican novelists
20th-century Mexican dramatists and playwrights
20th-century Mexican women writers
20th-century translators
Organization founders
Women founders